Matsch is a name of Austrian origin that means "mud" or "slush". It may refer to the following:

People
 Elisabeth von Matsch, (1380's — around 1439), last countess of Toggenburg
 Franz von Matsch, (1861 — 1942), Austrian artist
 Richard Paul Matsch (1930–2019), United States federal judge
 House of Matsch, Swiss and Austrian nobility, see :de:Matsch (Adelsgeschlecht)

Places
 Matsch Ridge, ridge in Ellsworth Land, Antarctica
 Matscher Tal ("Matsch valley"), valley in northern Italy

Other
 Matsch (cards), a situation in certain card games where one side takes no tricks or scores few points.